Kuhelika is a 1952 Bengali film. The film was directed by Ramesh Bose and was made under the banner of Sunshine Productions. Dakshinamohan Thakur scored music of the film.

Plot

Cast 
 Ahindra Choudhury
 Tulsi Chakraborty
 Amar Choudhury
 Santosh Sinha
 Ashu Bose
 Rajlakshmi Debi
 Nani Majumdar
 Bandana Debi
 Debiprasad Chowdhury
 Monika Ghosh
 Sushil Bandyopadhyay

See also 
 Matri Sneha
 Satya Pathe

References

External links 
 Kuhelika at CITWF

1952 films
Bengali-language Indian films
1950s Bengali-language films